One Week Friends is a 2014 romantic comedy Japanese anime series based on the manga series written by Matcha Hazuki and serialized in Square Enix's Gangan Joker magazine. One day, high school sophomore Yuki Hase happens to notice that his classmate, Kaori Fujimiya always seems to spend much of her time all by herself. Mustering up his courage, Yuki approaches Kaori and attempts to befriend her which she reluctantly allows. However, after the pair share many meaningful and fun conversations, Kaori denies her friendship with Yuki, stating that she loses the memories of any friends she makes each week. Despite this, the story follows Yuki and his determination to become Kaori's friend over and over again as the weeks go by.

The anime is produced by Brain's Base and directed by Tarou Iwasaki, with script writing by Shōtarō Suga, character designs by Eri Yamazaki and soundtrack music by Nobuko Toda. The series premiered on Tokyo MX on April 6, 2014 and ran for twelve episodes until June 22, 2014, with later airings on MBS, TVA, AT-X and BS11. The series was picked up by Crunchyroll for online simulcast streaming in North America and other select parts of the world. Square Enix began releasing the series in Japan on Blu-ray and DVD volumes starting on June 18, 2014. The anime was licensed by Sentai Filmworks for distribution via select digital outlets and a home media release in North America. This was followed by its acquisition by Madman Entertainment for Australian distribution.

The ending theme is a cover of Sukima Switch's 2004 single,  by Kaori Fujimiya (Sora Amamiya).



Episode list

Specials
The following special episodes are part of a mini-series titled,  and were released together with the BD / DVD sets of the main anime series. The episodes recall the events of the original anime series told in retrospect from Kaori's point of view as she writes in her diary.

Home media
Square Enix began releasing the series in Japan on Blu-ray and DVD volumes starting on June 18, 2014. The complete series will be released on subtitled DVD format by Madman Entertainment on May 20, 2015. The complete series will be released by Sentai Filmworks on DVD and Blu-ray format on July 7, 2015. These releases will contain Japanese audio and English subtitles.

Notes

References

External links
Official anime website

One Week Friends